Hastings was an electoral district of the Legislative Assembly of the Parliament of the Province of Canada, in Canada West (now Ontario).  Based on Hastings County, it fronted on the Bay of Quinte on Lake Ontario and extended north. It was created in 1841, upon the establishment of the Province of Canada by the union of Upper Canada and Lower Canada.

Hastings electoral district  was represented by one member in the Legislative Assembly.  It was abolished in 1867, upon the creation of Canada and the province of Ontario.

Boundaries 

Hastings electoral district was located on the north shore of the Bay of Quinte on Lake Ontario and extended north.  It was based on Hastings County.  The town of Belleville was the  major centre.

The Union Act, 1840 had merged the two provinces of Upper Canada and Lower Canada into the Province of Canada, with a single Parliament.  The separate parliaments of Lower Canada and Upper Canada were abolished.  The Union Act provided that the pre-existing electoral boundaries of Upper Canada would continue to be used in the new Parliament, unless altered by the Union Act itself.

Hastings County had been an electoral district in the Legislative Assembly of Upper Canada.  Its boundaries were not altered by the Union Act. Those boundaries had originally been set by a proclamation of the first Lieutenant Governor of Upper Canada, John Graves Simcoe, in 1792:

The boundaries had been further defined by a statute of Upper Canada in 1798:

In 1821, the townships of Elzever, Madoc and Marmora were added to Hastings County.

Since Hastings electoral district was not changed by the Union Act, those boundaries continued to be used for the new electoral district. Hastings was represented by one member in the Legislative Assembly.

Members of the Legislative Assembly 

Hastings was represented by one member in the Legislative Assembly. The following were the members for Hastings.

Notes

Significant elections 
Hastings was an important battleground during the first Parliament of the Province of Canada.  Robert Baldwin, the leader of the Reform movement in Canada West, was elected in the general election of 1841, defeating Edmund Murney, who had represented Hastings in the last Parliament of Upper Canada.

The next year, Baldwin and his political partner from Canada East, Louis-Hippolyte Lafontaine both became members of the Executive Council, which was a significant step in the development of responsible government.  However, the law at that time required that if a member of the Legislative Assembly took an office of profit under the Crown, they were required to vacate their seats and again stand for election.  Baldwin did so, triggering a by-election.

The by-election for Hastings was held in November, 1842 and became a significant battle between the Reform group and the Tories.  Edmund Murney was again the candidate for the Tories, and he defeated Baldwin, which was a major loss for the Reformers.  Lafontaine was able to persuade the sitting member of Rimouski in Canada East to retire, opening up the Rimouski seat.  Baldwin then ran in the by-election in Rimouski and was elected in January, 1843, enabling him to re-enter the house.  A second by-election was held in Hastings in the fall of 1843, which Murney also won.

Abolition 

The district was abolished on July 1, 1867, when the British North America Act, 1867 came into force, creating Canada and splitting the Province of Canada into Quebec and Ontario.  It was succeeded by electoral districts of the same name in the House of Commons of Canada and the Legislative Assembly of Ontario.

References 

.

Electoral districts of Canada West